Gina Crawford is a former professional triathlete from New Zealand. She competes in World Triathlon Corporation (WTC) Ironman and Ironman 70.3 triathlons. An Ironman triathlon consists of a 2.4 mi (3.8 km) swim, 112 mi (180.2 km) bike and a 26.2 mi (42.2 km) run. An Ironman 70.3 triathlon consists of a 1.2 mi (1.9 km) swim, 56 mi (90.1 km) bike and a 13.1 mi (21.1 km) run.

Crawford's time of 9:08:23 at Ironman Western Australia 2007 was the 11th fastest women's time in the world in the WTC Ironman 2008 series where 6,223 women finished. (286 Professional + 5,937 Amateurs)

Results

Notes

External links

Living people
New Zealand female triathletes
Year of birth missing (living people)
21st-century New Zealand women